Bazqush may refer to:
 Boshgaz
 Kalateh-ye Boshgazi